Marcos "Wasabi" Rios (born December 12, 1999) is an Argentinian kickboxer, currently competing in the featherweight division of Glory.

As of February 2023, he is ranked as the tenth best super featherweight (-67.5 kg) kickboxer in the world by Beyond Kick.

Martial arts career
On November 17, 2019, Rios took part in the Bosch Tour Super Eight one-day tournament. He overcame his quarterfinal opponent Marcelo Romero, semifinal opponent Edwin Montaño and his opponent in the finals, Nicolás Vega, in the same manner - by first-round knockout.

Rios faced Nicolás Rosas at Guerra de Leones on June 4, 2022. He won the fight by unanimous decision.

Rios made his WGP Kickboxing return against Walter Candia at WGP Kickboxing 66: Almeida vs. Galaz on September 3, 2022. He won the fight by a first-round technical knockout.

On October 23, 2022 Rios defended his ISKA Muay Thai Argentina title against Marcos Egui at Devil Fight Night 35. He won the fight by knockout in the third round.

Rios faced the Wu Lin Feng -63 kg World champion Denis Wosik at Glory Rivals 5 on February 11, 2023. He won the fight by split decision.

Rios faced Chihiro Suzuki at KNOCK OUT 2023 SUPER BOUT “BLAZE” on March 5, 2023. He lost the fight by a first-round knockout.

Championships and accomplishments
Bosch Tour
2017 Bosch Tour Muay Thai -64 kg Championship
2019 Bosch Tour Super Eight -64.5 kg Tournament Winner

World Boxing Council Muay Thai
2018 WBC Muay Thai Argentina -64.5kg Championship

International Sport Kickboxing Association
 2018 ISKA Muay Thai Argentina -65kg Championship

Fight record

|-
|-  style="text-align:center; background:#fbb"
| 2023-03-05 || Loss||align=left| Chihiro Suzuki || KNOCK OUT 2023 SUPER BOUT “BLAZE” || Tokyo, Japan || KO (Right hook) || 1 ||0:46 
|-
|-  style="text-align:center; background:#cfc"
| 2023-02-11 || Win ||align=left| Denis Wosik || Glory Rivals 5 || Tulum, Mexico || Decision (Split) || 3 || 3:00
|-
|-  style="text-align:center; background:#cfc"
| 2022-10-23 || Win ||align=left| Marcos Egui || Devil Fight Night 35 || Argentina || KO (Front kick) || 3 ||  
|-
! style=background:white colspan=9 |
|-
|-  style="text-align:center; background:#cfc"
| 2022-09-03 || Win ||align=left| Walter Candia || WGP Kickboxing 66: Almeida vs. Galaz || São Paulo, Brazil || TKO (Punches) || 1 || 2:38 

|-  style="text-align:center; background:#cfc"
| 2022-08-21 || Win ||align=left| Pablo Hernan || Devil Fight Night 34|| Buenos Aires, Argentina || TKO (Referee stoppage/cut) ||1 || 
|-
! style=background:white colspan=9 |

|-  style="text-align:center; background:#c5d2ea"
| 2022-06-25 || NC ||align=left| Alfredo Gonzalez || War of Nations  || Cancun, Mexico ||  || || 

|-  style="text-align:center; background:#cfc"
| 2022-06-04 || Win ||align=left| Nicolás Rosas || Guerra de Leones || Argentina || Decision (Unanimous) || 5 || 3:00
|-
|-  style="text-align:center; background:#cfc"
| 2022-02-14 || Win ||align=left| Zion Silva || Supreme FG || São Paulo, Brazil || TKO (Punches) || 1 || 2:38 
|-
|-  style="text-align:center; background:#cfc"
| 2021-11-21 || Win ||align=left| Carlos Machado || Main Event Championship III || Buenos Aires, Argentina || TKO (Punches) || 1 || 2:38 
|-
|-  style="text-align:center; background:#cfc"
| 2021-07-03 || Win ||align=left| Daniel Rico || Budo Sento Championship: Volume 3 || Mexico || KO (Right straight) || 1 || 2:48
|-
|-  style="text-align:center; background:#cfc"
| 2021-06-21 || Win ||align=left| Julio Reyes ||RFL Muay Thai Extreme 20 || Puebla, Mexico || TKO (Referee stoppage) || 2|| 
|-
|-  style="text-align:center; background:#cfc"
| 2021-05-21 || Win ||align=left| Nahoma Hernández || Gala 3 || Santiago, Nuevo León, Mexico || KO (Right hook) || 2 || 2:59
|-
|-  style="text-align:center; background:#cfc"
| 2021-04-10 || Win ||align=left| Luis Perez || Budo Sento Championship: Volume 2 || Mexico || KO (Knee) || 1 || 2:00

|-  style="text-align:center; background:#cfc"
| 2021-03-21 || Win ||align=left| Alan Parraiga || Combate Supremo  || Mexico || KO (Knees) || 1 || 
|-
|-  style="text-align:center; background:#fbb"
| 2021-02-21 || Loss ||align=left| Alan Yauny || Torneos De Muay Thai || Argentina || Decision (Unanimous) || 5 || 3:00
|-
! style=background:white colspan=9 |

|-  style="text-align:center; background:#cfc"
| 2019-11-17 || Win ||align=left| Nicolás Vega || Bosch Tour, Super Eight Final || Buenos Aires, Argentina || KO  || 1 || 
|-
! style=background:white colspan=9 |
|-
|-  style="text-align:center; background:#cfc"
| 2019-11-17 || Win ||align=left| Edwin Montaño || Bosch Tour, Super Eight Semifinal || Buenos Aires, Argentina || KO  || 1 || 
|-
|-  style="text-align:center; background:#cfc"
| 2019-11-17 || Win ||align=left| Marcelo Romero || Bosch Tour, Super Eight Quarterfinal || Buenos Aires, Argentina || KO  || 1 || 
|-
|-  style="text-align:center; background:#cfc"
| 2019-09-15 || Win ||align=left| Luis Fernando || Bosch Tour || Buenos Aires, Argentina || KO  || 2 || 
|-
|-  style="text-align:center; background:#cfc"
| 2019-08-02 || Win ||align=left| Heber Gaspar || WGP 56 || Buenos Aires, Argentina || KO (Right straight) || 1 || 2:58
|-
|-  style="text-align:center; background:#cfc"
| 2019-07-06 || Win ||align=left| YodPT Petchrungruang || Bosch Tour || Portela, Argentina || Decision (Unanimous) || 5 || 3:00
|-
! style=background:white colspan=9 |
|-
|-  style="text-align:center; background:#cfc"
| 2019-06-10 || Win ||align=left| Hugo Espinoza || Punishers 10 || Buenos Aires, Argentina || KO (Knee) || 2 || 
|-
|-  style="text-align:center; background:#cfc"
| 2019-05-18 || Win ||align=left| Matías Farinelli || Copa Thaibox || Buenos Aires, Argentina || KO (Right cross) || 4 ||

|-  style="text-align:center; background:#cfc"
| 2019-03-15 || Win ||align=left| Cristian Pastore || El Unico Top Fighters || Buenos Aires, Argentina || Decision (Unanimous) || 5 || 3:00

|-  style="text-align:center; background:#cfc"
| 2018-11-10 || Win ||align=left| Federico Vermengo || Bosch Tour 14 || Buenos Aires, Argentina || TKO (Referee stoppage)|| 1 ||  
|-
! style=background:white colspan=9 |

|-  style="text-align:center; background:#cfc"
| 2018-10-27 || Win ||align=left| ||  Maniatics Fight 15 || Santa Fe Province, Argentina || Decision|| 3 || 3:00 

|-  style="text-align:center; background:#cfc"
| 2018-07-22 || Win ||align=left| Luiz Goncalves || WKN Simply the Best 21 - Bosch Tour|| Buenos Aires, Argentina || KO (Overhand right)|| 3 || 1:40 

|-  style="text-align:center; background:#cfc;"
| 2018-06-10 || Win|| align=left| Erik Miloc || Punishers 9, Final || Buenos Aires, Argentina || Decision (Unanimous)|| 3 || 3:00

|-  style="text-align:center; background:#cfc;"
| 2018-06-10 || Win|| align=left| Franco Petrone || Punishers 9, Semi Final || Buenos Aires, Argentina || ||  || 

|-  style="text-align:center; background:#cfc;"
| 2018-05-18 || Win|| align=left| Arturo Aguaisol || Simply the Best 19 || Buenos Aires, Argentina || KO (Left hook to the body) || 3 ||1:40 

|-  style="text-align:center; background:#cfc"
| 2018-04-18 || Win ||align=left| Aekmanee Sitpalapon || The Global Fight, MAX Muay Thai stadium || Pattaya, Thailand || TKO || 2 || 0:40 

|-  style="text-align:center; background:#cfc"
| 2018-04-01 || Win ||align=left| Tiwthong Sakon Nakhon || MAX Muay Thai || Pattaya, Thailand || KO (Right cross) || 2 || 

|-  style="text-align:center; background:#cfc"
| 2018-03-20 || Win ||align=left| Yordarwut MaximumMuayThai || Galaxy Boxing Stadium || Patong, Thailand || Decision || 3 ||3:00 

|-  style="text-align:center; background:#fbb"
| 2018-03-10 || Loss ||align=left| Chaiyo Por.Sakda || Singpatong, Patong Boxing Stadium || Patong, Thailand || Decision || 3 ||3:00 

|-  style="text-align:center; background:#cfc"
| 2018-02-12|| Win ||align=left| Francisco Correa || Top Fight X-Treme|| Gualeguaychú, Argentina || Decision ||5 || 3:00 
|-
! style=background:white colspan=9 |

|-  style="text-align:center; background:#cfc"
| 2017-11-27 || Win ||align=left| Alejandro Rosa ||  || Argentina || Decision || 3 ||3:00 

|-  style="text-align:center; background:#cfc"
| 2017-11-17 || Win ||align=left|  || Golden Fight || Argentina || KO || 2 || 

|-  style="text-align:center; background:#cfc"
| 2017-10-01 || Win ||align=left| Christian Guido || Bosch Tour || Buenos Aires, Argentina ||  || ||  
|-
! style=background:white colspan=9 |

|-  style="text-align:center; background:#cfc"
| 2017-09-16 || Win ||align=left| Pablo Orue || Kick Boxing Extremo VIII ||  Argentina ||  || ||  

|-  style="text-align:center; background:#cfc"
| 2017-07-16 || Win ||align=left| Maximiliano Nuñez || Bosch Tour 5|| Buenos Aires, Argentina || KO (Knees) || 1 || 2:44 

|-  style="text-align:center; background:#cfc"
| 2017-06-18|| Win ||align=left| Bruno Lavalle || Punishers || Buenos Aires, Argentina || KO || ||  

|-  style="text-align:center; background:#cfc"
| 2017-05-14|| Win ||align=left| Francisco Correa || Bosch Tour 4|| Buenos Aires, Argentina || Decision ||3 || 3:00 

|-  style="text-align:center; background:#fbb"
| 2017-02-26 || Loss||align=left| Nicolas Jara || Bosch Tour 3 || Buenos Aires, Argentina || Decision || 5 || 3:00 
|-
! style=background:white colspan=9 |

|-  style="text-align:center; background:#cfc"
| 2017-01-06 || Win ||align=left| Esteban Atzurica || Top Fight Muay Thai || Argentina || TKO || 2 ||  

|-  style="text-align:center; background:#cfc"
| 2016-12-03 || Win||align=left| Alan Yauny || Copa Thaibox ||Buenos Aires,  Argentina || Decision || 3 || 3:00

|-  style="text-align:center; background:#cfc"
| 2016-10-30 || Win ||align=left| Emiliano Nieri || Muay Kard Chuek Fight Night|| Buenos Aires, Argentina || KO (Jumping knee) || 1 ||

|-  style="text-align:center; background:#cfc"
| 2016-07-31 || Win ||align=left| Franco Presentado || Bosch Tour 2|| Buenos Aires, Argentina || TKO (Spinning back fist) || 2 ||  
|-
| colspan=9 | Legend:

See also
 List of male kickboxers

References

2000 births
Living people
Argentine male kickboxers
Glory kickboxers
People from General Rodríguez Partido
Sportspeople from Buenos Aires Province